The 2016 Liga Futebol Amadora is the first season of the Liga Futebol Amadora. The season began on 25 February 2016. The Primeira Divisão began on February 25 and finished on July 24, while the Segunda Divisão began on March 8 and was finished in the final match on June 28. All games are played at the Dili Municipal Stadium.

Stadiums  
 Primary venues used in the Liga Futebol Amadora:

Locations

Primera Divisao

Teams
After qualifying the playoffs, there are 8 teams that will play in this league.

League table

Result table

Segunda Divisao

Teams
After qualifying the playoffs, there are 13 teams that will play in this league.

Group A

Playoff

Group B

Final

|-

References

External links
Official website
Official Facebook page

Liga Futebol Amadora
Timor-Leste
Timor-Leste